Podgrad is a settlement east of the capital Ljubljana in central Slovenia. It belongs to the City Municipality of Ljubljana. It lies on the right bank of the Ljubljanica River at the entrance into the Besnica Valley. The Ljubljanica in turn flows into the Sava immediately northeast of the settlement core. The railway line from Ljubljana to Zidani Most runs through the settlement. The area is part of the traditional region of Lower Carniola and is now included with the rest of the municipality in the Central Slovenia Statistical Region.

Name
The name Podgrad (literally, 'below the castle') is a fused prepositional phrase that has lost its case inflection. It refers to the village's location below Osterberg Castle ( or Ostri vrh), the ruins of which are located on Castle Hill west of Besnica Creek. Osterberg Castle is also the source of the name of the settlement of Sostro.

History

A chemical factory was established in Podgrad in the second half of the 19th century but burned down in 1880. It was reestablished in 1910 as pigment factory that later expanded into producing organic dyes. The Arbo company was created from the plant in 1953, and the dye operations were then transferred to Celje.

Castles
Osterberg Castle was built circa 1015 by the Counts of Scharffenberg, lesser nobles subject to the Spanheims. In the 16th century, Alexander zu Osterberg built a new manor at Dol pri Ljubljani across the Sava River, after which Osterberg Castle fell into disrepair. In the 18th century, Povše Castle was built below the old castle and closer to the Ljubljanica River. It was later purchased by the Kansky family and renovated in 1933.

References

External links
Podgrad on Geopedia

Populated places in the City Municipality of Ljubljana
Polje District